"Industry Baby" is a song by American rappers Lil Nas X and Jack Harlow, released on July 23, 2021, through Columbia Records. The song features co-production by American rapper and record producer Kanye West and production duo Take a Daytrip. It is the third single from Lil Nas X's debut studio album, Montero (2021), following up the international success of lead single "Montero (Call Me by Your Name)". The song debuted at number 2 on the Billboard Hot 100 for the week of August 7, 2021, and became Lil Nas X's third and Harlow's first number-one single on the chart on the week of October 23, 2021 after a massive gain in digital sales. On October 9, 2021, an extended version was released that features a short verse from Lil Nas X during the outro.
The song received a nomination for Best Melodic Rap Performance at the 64th Annual Grammy Awards.

Background and release

In March 2021, Nike, Inc. filed a lawsuit against the art collective MSCHF, who designed the Satan Shoes as promotion for Lil Nas X's song, "Montero (Call Me by Your Name)". The case was settled in April, though on July 16, Lil Nas X posted a video on TikTok claiming that he had an upcoming court hearing regarding it on July 19. The date of this supposed court hearing, however, turned out to be the release date of the teaser for "Industry Baby" in the form of a skit parodying the lawsuit, with him ostensibly appearing on trial for the Satan Shoes, but quickly shifting focus towards his sexuality. The teaser was accompanied by a website.

In late June, a demo version of the song with slightly different instrumentals was leaked online. The demo version included no features.

Ahead of the song's release, Lil Nas X shared a letter addressed to his 20-year-old self noting that the song is one "for us". Among other things, he writes of his stagnation during the COVID-19 pandemic, ostracization due to his sexuality, and staying strong in the face of adversity to witness his future success.

Alongside the release of the song and music video on July 23, 2021, Lil Nas X also partnered with the non-profit organization The Bail Project through the Bail X Fund, raising money with the goal of ending cash bail in the United States in mind.

Composition
Clash described the song "as a bubbling piece of pop-edged rap". Billboard described the song as an "expertly crafted rap anthem". The song is written in the key of E-flat minor with a tempo of 150 BPM with a time signature of 4/4 in common time, using a iv-V-i chord progression. It was originally planned to feature a guest appearance from Nicki Minaj; however, Lil Nas X did not receive a response from her.

Accolades

Music videos

"Industry Baby (Prelude)" 
The trailer video for "Industry Baby" was released on July 19, 2021 on YouTube. The story was written by Lil Nas X, and he also plays all the main roles in the video (judge, attorney, prosecutor, himself, as well as an audience member).

The video is a fake "Nike vs. Lil Nas X" trial taking place in the Supreme Court, in reference to the  Satan Shoes Court case. It starts with Lil Nas X's attorney saying that his client has "nothing to do with this", before the prosecution passes around one of the Satan Shoes while asking the singer about his sexuality. Lil Nas X starts to counter that his sexuality has nothing to do with the case, before admitting that he is gay. The judge then proceeds to sentence him to 5 years in Montero State Prison - a fictional prison named after the singer's real name, Montero Hill.

"Industry Baby" 
The music video for the song "Industry Baby" was uploaded on July 23, 2021 on Lil Nas X's YouTube channel through Vevo, and as of May 9, 2022, it had more than 341 million views (341,095,155). It was directed by Christian Breslauer and produced by Andrew Lerios, based on a story by Lil Nas X. Other credits include Luis Caraza as the video editor and Bryson Pintard as the art director. The video starred Lil Nas X, Jack Harlow, Colton Haynes as head of security and Vanessa Buchholz as a prison guard. Jason Momoa lookalike Phil Brandt is also visible in the prison yard. The dancing was choreographed by Sean Bankhead. According to the video credits, it also incorporated 20 dancers, 9 "prison guards" and 29 "prisoners".

The video starts with Lil Nas X being incarcerated in the Montero State Prison, 3 months after being sentenced in the prelude video. He is seen polishing his musical awards, walking around the prison and lifting weights in the courtyard, surrounded by the other inmates wearing bright pink uniforms. Jack Harlow brings a "Book of Montero" to Lil Nas X which contains a hammer, and the singer uses it to dig a tunnel in his cell wall. He manages to knock out the security guard, who is distracted by the Montero (Call Me by Your Name) music video playing on his phone, and pushes a button to open all the prison cells. The video switches to Harlow, who walks calmly through the prison as all the inmates escape. The video ends with the inmates leaving the prison aboard a prison bus, driven by Harlow and with Lil Nas X sitting on its roof, the prison in flames behind them.

The video pays homage to the 1994 film The Shawshank Redemption and the 1979 film Escape from Alcatraz.

"Industry Baby (Uncensored Video)" 
Five days later, on July 28, 2021, Lil Nas X trolled fans by releasing the "uncensored" version of his "Industry Baby" music video. The title refers to the censoring of the naked shower dancing scene from the original. This version starts the same as the original, but when the shower head is shown just before the dance starts, the video appears to buffer, showing a spinning circle. The video stays this way for the remaining duration of the music video, never actually showing the rest of the video or uncensoring the censored scene.

Track listings
Digital download and streaming
 "Industry Baby" – 3:32

Digital download and streaming – 2.0
 "Industry Baby" – 3:32
 "Industry Baby" (Extended) – 3:47

Credits and personnel
Credits adapted from Tidal.

 Lil Nas Xvocals
 Jack Harlowvocals
 Take a Daytripproduction, vocal production
Denzel Baptisterecording engineering
 Kanye Westproduction, horns 
 Nick Leeco-production, trombone
 Roy Lenzorecording engineering
 David Dickensonrecording assistant
 Drew Sligerrecording assistant, miscellaneous producer
 Raul Cubinaprogramming
 Mervin Hernandezrecording assistant
 Eric Laggmastering
 Patrizio "Teezio" Pigliapocomixing
 Ryan Svendsentrumpet
 Blunt Action cover art

Charts

Weekly charts

Year-end charts

Certifications

Release history

See also
List of Billboard Hot 100 number ones of 2021

References

2021 songs
2021 singles
Lil Nas X songs
Jack Harlow songs
Billboard Hot 100 number-one singles
Columbia Records singles
Number-one singles in New Zealand
Songs about fame
Songs written by Lil Nas X
Songs written by Jack Harlow
Songs written by Kanye West
Song recordings produced by Kanye West
Song recordings produced by Take a Daytrip